The Half Moon Bay Art and Pumpkin Festival is an annual festival held in the coastside community of Half Moon Bay, California for one weekend during pumpkin harvest season.  It is one of the oldest and largest local festivals in California.  Proceeds go to local civic causes and to the beautification of the downtown area of Half Moon Bay.
There is no admission charge for the event.

Dates
The annual event is held in October. Columbus Day Monday is the Safeway World Champion Pumpkin Weigh-in contest. The Half Moon Bay Art and Pumpkin Festival is a two-day event held the following Saturday and Sunday, from 1971 to 2019, and since 2022.

The COVID-19 pandemic caused the festival to be canceled in 2020; the 50th was deferred to 2021. In 2021 the festival was again canceled, although there was a pumpkin weigh-off.

Locations
The festival is located in downtown Half Moon Bay on Main Street between Miramontes and Spruce Streets. 
The Great Pumpkin Parade is held at noon on Saturday and runs east along Miramontes, North on Main St, and West on Mill Street.
There are two music stages, one at the south entrance and one located next to the food court in the IDES grounds.  A family stage is located at 620 Main Street.
The associated Safeway World Championship Pumpkin Weigh-In is located on the IDES Grounds at 735 Main Street on Columbus Day, the Monday prior to the festival.

History
The Half Moon Bay Art and Pumpkin Festival began in 1971 with the formation of the Main Street Beautification Committee.  The group was formed to raise funds for the revitalization of Main Street, which was beginning to show signs of decay.  With an abundance of pumpkin patches in the area, the committee organized an old-fashioned harvest-style pumpkin festival.
The first festival attracted 30,000 people. That year only one non-profit organization offered food for sale.  The festival now includes dozens of local non-profit groups operating food and game booths, selling everything from pumpkin pie to linguisa sandwiches.  
Proceeds go to various civic and local causes and have included the construction of two parks, multiple scholarship funds, the installation of old-fashioned downtown street lights, the underground wiring of Main Street, and the renovation of City Hall.

Traditions

 The Safeway World Championship Pumpkin Weigh-Off attracts growers from around the United States. The weigh-off is held the Monday prior to the festival and the winners are on display during the festival weekend. In 2019 the Weigh-Off was awarded the Great Pumpkin Commonwealth's "World's Top Weigh-Off Site" award for having the ten heaviest pumpkins among the 114 GPC-sanctioned weigh-off sites worldwide.

{| class="wikitable mw-collapsible mw-collapsed"
|+ class="nowrap" | List of champion pumpkins:

|-
! Year !! Grower !! Weight (pounds)
|-
|2022 || Travis Gienger, Anoka MN || 2,560
|-
|2021 || Jeff Uhlmeyer, Olympia WA || 2,191
|-
|2020 || Travis Gienger, Anoka MN || 2,350
|-
|2019 || Leonardo Urena, Napa CA	 || 2,175
|-
|2018 || Steve Daletas, Pleasant Hill OR	 || 2,170
|-
|2017 || Joel Holland, Sumner WA	 || 2,363
|-
|2016 || Cindy Tobeck, Little Rock WA	 || 1,910
|-
|2015 || Steve Daletas, Pleasant Hill OR	 || 1,969
|-
|2014 || John Hawkley, Napa CA	 || 2,058
|-
|2013 || Gary Miller, Napa CA	 || 1,985
|-
|2012 || Thad Starr, Pleasant Hill OR	 || 1,775
|-
|2011 || Leonardo Urena, Napa CA	 || 1,704
|-
|2010 || Ron Root, Citrus Heights CA	 || 1,535
|-
|2009 || Don Young, Des Moines IA	 || 1,658
|-
|2008 || Thad Starr, Pleasant Hill OR	 || 1,528
|-
|2007 || Thad Starr, Pleasant Hill OR	 || 1,524
|-
|2006 || Joel Holland, Puyallup WA	 || 1,223
|-
|2005 || Joel Holland, Puyallup WA	 || 1,229
|-
|2004 || Joel Holland, Puyallup WA	 || 1,229
|-
|2003 || Steve Daletas, Pleasant Hill OR	 || 1,180
|-
|2002 || Kirk Mombert, Harrisburg OR	 || 1,173
|-
|2001 || Steve Daletas, Pleasant Hill OR	 || 1,016
|-
|2000 || Kirk Mombert, Harrisburg OR	 || 940
|-
|1999 || Jon Hunt, Elk Grove CA	 || 991
|-
|1998 || Lincoln Mettler, Eatonville WA	 || 974
|-
|1997 || Sherry LaRue, Tenino WA	 || 868
|-
|1996 || Kirk Mombert, Harrisburg, OR	 || 808
|-
|1995 || Jack La Rue, Tenino WA	 || 875
|-
|1994(tie) || Joel Holland, Puyallup WA  Pete Glasier, Sequim WA	 || 696
|-
|1993 || Joel Holland, Puyallup WA	 || 740
|-
|1992 || Joel Holland, Puyallup WA	 || 722
|-
|1991 || Cindi Glasier, Denver CO	 || 602
|-
|1990 || Tom Borchard, Salinas CA	 || 544
|-
|1989 || Mike Pezzini, Prunedale CA	 || 530
|-
|1988 || Tom Borchard, Salinas CA	 || 432
|-
|1987 || Tom Borchard, Salinas CA	 || 429
|-
|1986 || Arthur Quint, Castro Valley CA	 || 526
|-
|1985 || Arthur Quint, Castro Valley CA	 || 438
|-
|1984 || Norm Gallagher, Cheland WA	 || 612
|-
|1983 || Tom Borchard, Salinas CA	 || 408
|-
|1982 || Tom Borchard, Salinas CA	 || 307
|-
|1981 || Francis Collings, Petaluma CA	 || 337
|-
|1980 || Tom Borchard, Salinas CA	 || 275
|-
|1979 || Francis Collings, Petaluma VA	 || 349
|-
|1978 || Francis Collings, Petaluma CA	 || 298
|-
|1977 || Ray Chiesa, Half Moon Bay CA	 || 200
|-
|1976 || John Minaidis, Half Moon Bay CA	 || 208
|-
|1975 || John Minaidis, Half Moon Bay CA	 || 273
|-
|1974 || John Minaidis, Half Moon Bay CA	 || 132
|}

 Harvest inspired Arts and Crafts are represented by 250 artists and craftmakers.  Original works are available in glass, ceramics, metals, fiber, leather, wood, jewelry and fine art.
 Food is a big item at the festival.  Many food offerings include pumpkin such as pie, pancakes, bread, cheesecake, sausages, and ice cream.  Local coastal favorites include Brussels sprouts, artichoke hearts, and Portuguese linguisa sandwiches.  All food is provided by community non-profit groups.
 The Great Pumpkin Parade features the weigh-off champion pumpkin, marching bands, classic cars, and costumed children of all ages.
 Continuous entertainment is located on three stages throughout the festival.  A variety of music is available from Country, to Blues, to Reggae. 
 Family entertainment includes a costume contest, pumpkin carving, games, and a pie eating contest.
 Giant pumpkin carving is provided by Farmer Mike, a professional pumpkin carver that turns giant pumpkins (up to a thousand pounds) into faces and reliefs.  Farmer Mike has carved at the event for  years.
 Local wine and microbrews offer wine and beer by the glass.
 Other attractions include a Sunday Pumpkin Run/Walk, a talent show, a pancake breakfast, giant pumpkin photos, a poster contest exhibit, and a haunted house.

Traffic 
The popular event attracts more than 200,000 people to this rural community.  Major access from the greater San Francisco Bay Area is from Highway 92 to the east.  North/South access from San Francisco or Santa Cruz is available using coastal Highway 1.   The festival, combined with multiple pumpkin patches surrounding the town, generate severe traffic congestion each year.   Parking is limited to side streets or paid parking in lots sponsored by local organizations.

References

External links

 Miramar Events - official HMB Art and Pumpkin Festival web site
 http://www.halfmoonbaychamber.org/visiting_hmb/greatpumpkins.html

Art festivals in the United States
Harvest festivals
Half Moon Bay, California
Festivals in the San Francisco Bay Area
Tourist attractions in San Mateo County, California
Pumpkin festivals